One Born Every Minute is a British observational documentary series which shows activities taking place in the labour ward. The first series aired on Channel 4 in 2010, the second in 2011. Series 7 made its debut on 10 March 2015.

Production

One Born Every Minute has to date achieved the highest ratings of any "fixed rig" multicamera documentary series, with its most popular episodes attracting audiences in excess of five million.  The "rig" technique for making factual television was pioneered by Dragonfly founders Nick Curwin and Magnus Temple, in partnership with Channel 4 commissioning editor Simon Dickson, in 2008.

Awards
The first series won a 2010 BAFTA for best factual series; the second series was nominated for a 2011 BAFTA for best factual series. Airlock, who designed the interactive and multimedia material to accompany the series, were nominated for a 2010 BAFTA "New Media Award".

International versions

In February 2011 an American version of One Born Every Minute premiered in the USA on Lifetime Television and in August 2011 a French adaptation named Baby Boom premiered on France's TF1. There have been two seasons of the American show and five of the French. There have been eleven UK series.

Spoof
The 2013 edition of the Comic Relief telethon featured a three-way spoof/mini-episode aired under the One Born Every Minute title and logo: a parody of the show's format with appearances by the cast of Call the Midwife along with Matt Smith as the Doctor from Doctor Who and closing narration by Vanessa Redgrave.

See also
List of One Born Every Minute episodes

References

External links
  (Series 1, 2010)
  (Series 2, 2011)
 One Born Every Minute, Channel 4, review a review from The Daily Telegraph'
 New Channel 4 series focuses on Southampton's Princess Anne Hospital A news article from Southampton University Hospitals NHS Trust
 One Born Every Minute: labours of love a The Guardian blog article on the second UK series
 Last Night's TV - One Born Every Minute, Channel 4 a review of the second UK series from The Independent''
 Channel 4 - One Born Every Minute Episode Guide

2010 British television series debuts
2018 British television series endings
2010s British documentary television series
Channel 4 documentary series
English-language television shows
Pregnancy-themed television shows
Television series by Endemol